John Fergus Slattery (born 12 February 1949 in Dún Laoghaire, Ireland) is a former rugby union player who represented Ireland. He played schools rugby for Blackrock College and then moved on to play senior rugby for UCD, before earning a call up to the Ireland team in 1970. He subsequently left UCD to join Blackrock College R.F.C. During his career Slattery earned 61 caps, 18 as captain, and scored 3 tries. In 1971, he was a member of the British and Irish Lions squad that toured New Zealand, missing out on a start in the third Test due to illness. He played for the Barbarians in the famous 1973 game against the All Blacks in Cardiff. Slattery toured with the Lions again in 1974, playing in all four Tests and captaining the side for two provincial matches. He was captain of the most successful Irish touring side ever in 1979 which won 7 of the 8 matches in Australia including the two Tests in Brisbane and Sydney. In addition to the above honours, he was a member of the Irish Triple Crown-winning team in 1982.

Slattery was inducted into the International Rugby Hall of Fame in 2007.

References

External links
IRFU profile
Lions profile

Barbarians profile

People from Dún Laoghaire
Irish rugby union players
Ireland international rugby union players
Blackrock College RFC players
University College Dublin R.F.C. players
World Rugby Hall of Fame inductees
British & Irish Lions rugby union players from Ireland
Barbarian F.C. players
Rugby union flankers
1949 births
Living people
People educated at Blackrock College
Ireland international rugby sevens players
Sportspeople from Dún Laoghaire–Rathdown